Wilbert Granville Thodore Hogan Jr. (January 16, 1929 – August 7, 2004) was an American jazz drummer. He used both Granville and Wilbert professionally, and is credited variously with names and initials on albums.

Biography
Born in Galveston, Texas, Hogan played saxophone in high school and then switched to drums. He played with Earl Bostic from 1953 to 1955, before moving to New York City. Over the course of his career he played with Randy Weston, Kenny Drew, Kenny Dorham, Ray Charles, Elmo Hope, Bud Powell and Walter Bishop Jr. He was less active as a musician after the 1970s, and suffered from emphysema in the 1990s.  Hogan died on August 7, 2004, in San Antonio, Texas.

Discography
With Walter Bishop Jr. 
Speak Low (Jazztimes, 1961)
The Walter Bishop Jr. Trio / 1965 (Prestige, 1962 [1965])
With Earl Coleman
Earl Coleman Returns (Prestige, 1956)
With Hank Crawford
After Hours (Atlantic, 1966)
Mr. Blues (Atlantic, 1967)
Double Cross (Atlantic, 1968)
With Kenny Drew
This Is New (Riverside, 1957)
With Kenny Dorham
2 Horns / 2 Rhythm (Riverside, 1957)
This Is the Moment! (Riverside, 1958)
With Curtis Fuller
Soul Trombone (Impulse, 1961)
With Wilbur Harden
The King and I (Savoy, 1958)
With Ernie Henry
Last Chorus (Riverside, 1956–57)
With Fred Jackson
Hootin' 'n Tootin' (Blue Note, 1962)
With Elmo Hope
High Hope! (Beacon, 1961)
With Cal Massey
Blues to Coltrane (Candid, 1961)
With Leo Parker
Rollin' with Leo (Blue Note, 1961)
With Ike Quebec
The Complete Blue Note 45 Sessions (Blue Note, 1962)With A. K. SalimBlues Suite (Savoy, 1958)With Randy Weston'Get Happy with the Randy Weston Trio (Riverside, 1955)With These Hands... (Riverside, 1956)The Modern Art of Jazz by Randy Weston (Dawn, 1956)New Faces at Newport (MetroJazz, 1958)Uhuru Afrika (Roulette, 1960)

References

[ Hogan] at AllMusic
Leonard Feather and Ira Gitler, The Biographical Encyclopedia of Jazz''. Oxford, 1999, p. 324.

1929 births
2004 deaths
American jazz drummers
20th-century American drummers
American male drummers
Jazz musicians from Texas
20th-century American male musicians
American male jazz musicians